Spruyt is a Dutch surname meaning "sprout". At its origin it may have referred to its meaning as a young person / scion. The spelling in the Netherlands is usually Spruijt or Spruit, while Spruyt is the most common form in Belgium. People with the name include:

 Bart Jan Spruyt (born 1964), Dutch historian, journalist, and writer
 Ferre Spruyt (born 1986), Belgian speed skater
 Hendrik Spruyt
 Jan Willem Spruyt (1826–1908), South African civil servant, lawyer and statesman
 Jozef Spruyt (born 1943), Belgian road bicycle racer
Spruit
 (1906–1998), Dutch conductor and violinist
Herman Adrian Spruit (1911–1994), American founder of the Catholic Apostolic Church of Antioch

References

Dutch-language surnames